Alternaria euphorbiicola is a fungal plant pathogen.

References

External links

euphorbiicola
Fungal plant pathogens and diseases
Fungi described in 1908